The Continental Players was a short-lived albeit well-chronicled Hollywood-based theater workshop and stock company founded in 1938 by Max Reinhardt and William Dieterle. It was supported by Hollywood film executives with the aim of boosting the careers of European  in America, notably exiled Jews from Germany and Austria.

History

Die Reichskulturkammer of 1933 
In Germany, in 1933, by decree of Joseph Goebbels under a newly created agency called Die Reichskulturkammer (DKK), Jewish actors were, among other things, prohibited from performing on German stage.

Stock company objective 
The main objective of The Continental Players was to help newly arrived European actors and actresses warm-up to American audiences and hone their performing skills in the English language. A sub-objective was to cultivate employment opportunities by producing showcase productions – somewhat akin to a baseball farm team – for newly arrived talent. William Dieterle, who conceived the idea, was president. The board included powerful industry luminaries Harry Warner, Charlotte Hagenbruch (wife of Mrs. William Dieterle), A. Ronald Button, Leopold Jessner, and Walter Wanger, who, at the time, was President of the Academy of Motion Picture Arts and Sciences. Wanger financed the project. Only a few of the 60 initial members were Jewish exiles. Most members, nonetheless, faced challenges as actors and actresses in America. The Continental Players had two notable sponsoring organizations: (i) the American Guild for German Cultural Freedom (de) – Thomas Mann, President, and (ii) the German-American League for Culture, Los Angeles (a nationwide anti-Hitler league; not to be confused with its nemesis, the German-American Bund).

The theater workshop, since June 1938, had been led by Max Reinhardt under the auspices of Max Reinhardt's Workshop of Stage, Screen, and Radio.  Reinhardt provided the studios with well-trained bit actors.  According to author Saverio Giovacchini in his 2001 book, Hollywood Modernism, the workshop well-represented an alliance between Hollywood New Yorkers and Europeans as much as it exemplified a close relationship between Hollywood and experimental cinema.  Dieterle taught film directing; Henry Blanke – film production; Karl Freund and Rudolph Maté – experimental camerawork; John Huston – screenwriting; Edward G. Robinson and Paul Muni – acting; and Samson Raphaelson – dramaturgy.

Production 
In May and June 1939, The Continental Players produced William Tell. Leopold Jessner directed it for the sixth and last time in his career. The play had been controversial on German stage, partly due to a 1919 production directed by Jessner at the Stadttheater Berlin, wherein, instead of mounting a traditional repertory version with conservative themes, Jessner decided on a complete German expressionistic recast – replete with discordant speech and scenic experimentation designed by Emil Pirchan (de). The set was cubistic with platforms, runways, and steps.  Jessner's 1919 production angered right-wing conservatives and fascists.

The 1939 production failed, financially, due partly to actors struggling in English and partly to the version being non-traditional. The loss, about $30,000, was an impetus for shuttering the erstwhile popular production venue, The Players Dinner Theater. Yet, the effort was chronicled favorably as altruistic.

Experimental theater companies in Los Angeles in the latter 1930s 
 Contemporary Theater, founded 1934 by a coalition of Europeans and New Yorkers
 Modern Theater, founded by Edward Gering (brother of Marion Gering), with the help of Fritz Lang, Francis Lederer, Frank Capra, and Salka Viertel
 Hollywood Theater Alliance, founded 1939; Gertrude Ross Marks (de) was managing director

Notes and references

Notes

References 

Theatre companies in Los Angeles
Theatre production companies
Performing groups established in 1938
Experimental theatre

Jews and Judaism in Los Angeles
Expulsions of Jews